Electoral district of Fitzroy may refer to:
Electoral district of Fitzroy (Queensland), a former electorate of the Queensland Legislative Assembly
Electoral district of Fitzroy (Victoria), a former electorate of the Victorian Legislative Assembly